Impfondo is a district in the Likouala Region of north-eastern Republic of the Congo. The capital lies at Impfondo. Impfondo is also the home of Likoula's capital.

Towns and villages
Impfondo

Likouala Department
Districts of the Republic of the Congo